Bellroy is an Australian accessories brand making carry goods, including bags, folios, wallets, pouches, mobile phone cases, and key covers. It is a certified B Corporation.

History 
Bellroy was founded in 2009 by designers Andrew Fallshaw and Hadrien Monloup, and engineers Lina Calabria and Matthew Fallshaw. 'Bellroy' is derived from the towns of Bells Beach and Fitzroy, where the company has offices.

The brand launched its first wallets in August 2010.

In April 2019, Bellroy announced a partnership with Silas Capital, a New York-based growth equity firm that invests in consumer brands; and later that year was valued at $83 million.

In 2021 Bellroy was voted Australia's best small business workplace.

As of 2023, Bellroy employed over 100+ employees.

References

External links

Australian companies established in 2009
Companies based in Melbourne
Clothing brands of Australia
Fashion accessory brands
Privately held companies of Australia
B Lab-certified corporations in Australia
Personal accessory retailers of Australia